Serhiy Hryhorovych Mizin (born 25 September 1972 in Kyiv) is a former Ukrainian professional football midfielder who played for FC Dynamo Kyiv, FC CSKA Kyiv, FC Chornomorets Odesa, FC Dnipro Dnipropetrovsk, FC Karpaty Lviv, FC Kryvbas Kryvyi Rih, FC Metalist Kharkiv and FC Arsenal Kyiv in Ukrainian Premier League. He also scored 90 goals in 344 matches in the Ukrainian Premier League.

Mizin made seven appearances for the Ukraine national football team.

Honours
 Ukrainian Premier League champion: 1993, 1994, 1995.
 Ukrainian Cup winner: 1993.

External links
 
 

1972 births
Living people
Ukrainian footballers
Ukraine international footballers
Ukrainian football managers
Ukrainian Premier League players
FC Dynamo Kyiv players
FC CSKA Kyiv players
FC Karpaty Lviv players
FC Kryvbas Kryvyi Rih players
FC Dnipro players
FC Arsenal Kyiv players
FC Chornomorets Odesa players
FC Metalist Kharkiv players
FC Naftovyk Okhtyrka managers
Footballers from Kyiv
Association football midfielders